Starlight is a fictional superheroine appearing in American comic books published by Marvel Comics.

Publication history

Created by Steve Gerber and Sal Buscema, she first appeared in The Defenders # 35 (May 1976).

Fictional character biography
Tania Belinsky was born in Leningrad, in the former Soviet Union. Tania became a young neurosurgeon, though after her dissident father Andrei had been sent to Siberia, she adopted a costume and persona similar to the original Red Guardian's, and fought crime and protected dissidents in an attempt to reform Soviet society.  She left the USSR at the request of Doctor Strange to perform a brain transplant. She decided to stay in America and join the Defenders as an adventurer. She battled a Plant Man simulacrum alongside Doctor Strange. She was teleported to another dimension alongside Power Man and Doctor Strange, where she battled the original Eel and Porcupine. She also battled an unnamed masked Soviet. She teamed with Valkyrie and Hellcat to battle Doctor Strange as the Red Rajah and Nighthawk, Hulk, and Power Man.

Dr. Belinsky was brought to the lab complex of Sergei Krylov, alias the "Presence", a scientific genius who had become one of the most influential men behind the scenes of the Soviet government.  Sergei mentally dominated Tania, and used a Chernobyl-like nuclear disaster to transform Tania into his super-powered thrall with nuclear powers. She battled the Defenders alongside the Presence, and then separated from him. She was later assigned to investigate the Presence's reappearance, and after battling a giant amoeba, she reunited with the Presence. Alongside the Presence, she encountered the Hulk, Darkstar, Crimson Dynamo, Vanguard, Ursa Major, and Professor Phobos. She and the Presence left Earth since their radiation levels were too dangerous for them to remain. Tania and Sergei were eventually revealed to be laboratory subjects on one of the Stranger's laboratory worlds. After regaining their freedom, Tania took the name Starlight, and returned to Earth with the Presence and Jack of Hearts. She battled Quasar and the Fantastic Four, and aided the Presence in his attempt to kill Eon, though she ultimately admitted only doing so because the Presence (the only person who could safely remain around her due to him making her radioactive) threatened to abandon her if she did not serve as his henchwoman and lover. She was later seen battling Darkstar and the Black Widow.

Tania was then seen in the company of the Presence as his cosmic companion during his attempts to conquer Russia by mutating its citizens and armies into radioactive zombie-like beings. This included some of the Avengers, who fell under his power. He was defeated by Thor and Firebird, who proved immune to the transformations and Tania offered to restore all those who had been transformed to normal.

Later Tania and the Presence aided the Avengers in battling Kang. The Presence was planning to capitalize on the chaos Kang had sown on Earth by attempting to conquer Russia again once he was defeated, but Tania refused to allow it and this time, it was Tania who threatened to desert him if he did so.

At some point, after the Kang War, Starlight was able to reduce her radioactivity enough to reintegrate within society without fear of causing death to those around her. She later joins up with other Russian heroes to form the Protectorate, serving Immortus as palace guards against the Dire Wraiths. During this time, she falls in love with her teammate Vanguard. When the team manages to banish the Dire Wraith queen back to Limbo, Tania is sucked along with her.

Powers and abilities
As a result of mutation from cobalt radiation, Tania has superhuman strength, stamina, and durability. She can generate nuclear energy for flight at supersonic speeds, and to project radiation blasts. Starlight gives off low levels of nuclear radiation at all times, putting normal human beings who associate with her for any length of time at risk.

Tania has a gifted intellect, and is skilled at neurosurgery and medicine, with a PhD in medicine. She also has extensive experience in hand-to-hand combat and is a highly skilled athlete.

References

External links
http://www.marvel.com/universe/Red_Guardian_%28Tania_Belinsky%29

Characters created by Steve Gerber
Characters created by Sal Buscema
Comics characters introduced in 1976
Comics characters introduced in 1991
Fictional neurosurgeons
Fictional Soviet people
Marvel Comics characters who can move at superhuman speeds
Marvel Comics characters with superhuman strength
Marvel Comics female superheroes
Soviet Union-themed superheroes